Kamarkawarai-tepui, also spelled Kamarkaiwaran or Camarcai-barai, is the easternmost and tallest of the four main tepuis of the Los Testigos chain in Bolívar, Venezuela. It is connected to the two nearest peaks of the massif—Murisipán-tepui and Tereke-yurén-tepui—by a common basement (the westernmost peak, Aparamán-tepui, is relatively isolated by comparison). The mostly bare summit plateau of Kamarkawarai-tepui has a large, collapsed sinkhole opening in its western portion.

See also
 Distribution of Heliamphora

References

Tepuis of Venezuela
Mountains of Venezuela
Mountains of Bolívar (state)